Rino Agostinis (born April 4, 1953), sometimes referred to as Reno Agostinis, is a Canadian former soccer player who played as a defender.

Career 
Although born in Italy, his family moved to Canada when he was five years-old. Agostinis played in the National Soccer League in 1972 with Toronto Italia. He spent time back in Italy with Serie D side, AC Monfalcone, before returning to British Columbia to finish his degree at Simon Fraser University, where he also played. He was a preliminary selection for the 1976 Canadian Olympic team. Agostinis toured with national team, but was not featured on the final roster. In 1976, he played in the Vancouver Island Soccer League with Vancouver Italia-Canadian Pauls. The following season he played in the North American Soccer League with Tampa Bay Rowdies. He spent 1978 with the Florida Stars, a St. Petersburg, Florida-based club. In 1979, he signed with league rivals Seattle Sounders. Agostinis joined the St. Pete Thunder Bolts of the Southern Soccer League in November 1979.

External links
 NASL stats

References  

Living people
1953 births
Association football defenders
Canadian soccer players
Toronto Italia players
Seattle Sounders (1974–1983) players
Tampa Bay Rowdies (1975–1993) players
Canadian National Soccer League players
North American Soccer League (1968–1984) players
North American Soccer League (1968–1984) indoor players
Simon Fraser University alumni
People from Pordenone
Vancouver Columbus players
Footballers from Friuli Venezia Giulia